JOYclub is an online dating service and sex-positive community for sexual contacts. The site provides events, dating, communication, content sharing, and forums for people of different genders and sexual orientations. There is also an online magazine and a section with pornographic films.

History 
JOYclub was founded in 1999 as an internet forum. Since 2013, JOYclub has been a main product of F&P GmbH. In 2013, JOYclub got a Venus Award as the Best Erotic-Community. In 2019, the site had three million members and four million in 2021.

In 2020, the site started working in Spain. In 2021, JOYclub was launched in France. In 2022, JOYclub started in Mexico as well as in the UK.

JOYclub conducts various surveys on sexuality among its users. According to the book Online-Dating fur Dummies JOYclub has a strict authentication and identity verification procedure.

References 

Online dating services
Virtual communities
Internet forums